The 2009 Tour of Turkey is the 45th edition of professional road bicycle racing Tour of Turkey.

Stages

Stage 1: 12 April 2009: İstanbul, 142 km

Stage 2: 13 April 2009: İzmir > Kuşadası, 132.5 km

Stage 3: 14 April 2009: Kuşadası > Bodrum, 166.1 km

Stage 4: 15 April 2009: Bodrum > Marmaris, 166.9 km

Stage 5: 16 April 2009: Marmaris > Fethiye, 130 km

Stage 6: 17 April 2009: Fethiye > Finike, 194 km

Stage 7: 18 April 2009: Finike > Antalya, 114.5 km

Stage 8: 19 April 2009: Antalya > Alanya, 166 km

General classification

External links

Tour of Turkey
Tour of Turkey
Presidential Cycling Tour of Turkey by year